Shifeng may refer to:

Shifeng District, in Zhuzhou, Hunan, China
Shifeng Bridge, in Beijing, China
Shifen waterfall, a scenic waterfall located in Pingxi District, Taiwan